Adolf Weber may refer to:
 Adolf Weber (ophthalmologist) (1829–1915), German ophthalmologist
 Adolf Weber (economist) (1876–1963), German economist
 Adolf Vécsey (1915–1979), Hungarian football player, also known as Adolf Weber